Võ Văn Thưởng (born 13 December 1970) is a Vietnamese politician serving as the President of Vietnam since 2023, being the youngest person to serve in this position under the current Socialist Republic of Vietnam. As the country's head of state, Thưởng is the second highest official in Vietnam after the General Secretary of the Communist Party.

He is currently a member of the Politburo and served as the Executive Secretary of the Communist Party of Vietnam (CPV) from 2021 until 2023. He is also a member of the 15th National Assembly of Vietnam. He was the head of Central Propaganda Department of the Communist Party of Vietnam from 2016 to 2021, a deputy standing Secretary of the Ho Chi Minh City Party Committee; Secretary of the Quang Ngai Party Committee; standing Secretary and First Secretary of the Central Committee of the Ho Chi Minh Communist Youth Union, Chairman of the Vietnam Youth Federation. He is the youngest standing member of the Secretariat of the Party Central Committee in the history of the Communist Party of Vietnam.

Thưởng is a member of the Communist Party of Vietnam, holding a Master's degree in philosophy and an advanced degree in political theory. He was a member of the 12th and 14th National Assembly of Vietnam, and a member of the Central Committee of the Communist Party of Vietnam since 2011.

Background and education 
Võ Văn Thưởng was born on 13 December 1970 in Hai Duong, Democratic Republic of Vietnam. His family left the South during the Vietnam War. He was born and raised in the North. In 1988, he majored in Marxist-Leninist Philosophy at the Faculty of Philosophy, University of Ho Chi Minh City. In 1992, he graduated with a Bachelor of Philosophy in Marxism-Leninism. After that, he pursued a master's degree in philosophy at the University of Social Sciences and Humanities, Vietnam National University, Ho Chi Minh City, and received a Master of Philosophy in 1999. On 18 November 1993, he was admitted to the Communist Party of Vietnam and became an official member on 18 November 1994. He also attended courses at the Ho Chi Minh National Academy of Politics, receiving an advanced degree in political theory.

Career

Early career

University career 
In 1992, the year he graduated from university, he was elected as Deputy Secretary of the Youth Union of the General University of Ho Chi Minh City. In 1993, he became the Vice Head of the Professional University Committee of the Ho Chi Minh City Youth Union. In October 1996, he was elected to the Standing Committee of Ho Chi Minh City Youth Union, and held the position of Head of Professional University Committee of Ho Chi Minh City Youth Union.

Communist Youth Union 
In October 1995, he continued to work for the Youth Union, while concurrently holding the position of Vice Chairman and General Secretary of the Ho Chi Minh City Students' Association, a newly established body, and Secretary of the Central Committee of the Vietnam Students' Association. On 26 November 1997, at the National Youth Union Congress, he was elected a member of the 7th Central Committee of the Youth Union. He was assigned to be a Party member, Secretary of the Personnel Committee of the Ho Chi Minh City National University Union. In January 2000, he became the Chairman of the Ho Chi Minh City Students' Association for the second term and was elected Vice Chairman of the Vietnam Students' Association. In May 2001, he took office as Deputy Secretary of Ho Chi Minh City Youth Union. In November 2002, he was appointed Chairman of the Ho Chi Minh City Youth Union. In March 2003, he was the Secretary of the Ho Chi Minh City Youth Federation and was elected to be a Member of the Ho Chi Minh City Party Committee from October 2003. He held this position until 2004, succeeded by Tat Thanh Cang.

From 8 to 11 December 2002, at the National Youth Union Congress in Hanoi, Võ Văn Thưởng was elected a member of the Standing Committee of the Central Committee of the Ho Chi Minh Communist Youth Union. In December 2004, Võ Văn Thưởng was appointed Secretary of the Party Committee of District 12, Ho Chi Minh City. On 24 April 2006, at the National Congress of the Communist Party of Vietnam, he was elected as an alternate member of the 10th Central Committee of the Communist Party of Vietnam. In October 2006, he was appointed by the Politburo to be the Standing Secretary of the Central Committee of the Ho Chi Minh Communist Youth Union. He was also elected as First Secretary of the Central Committee of the Ho Chi Minh Communist Youth Union, succeeding Dao Ngoc Dung in January 2007. In December 2007, he was elected as the First Secretary of the Central Committee of the Ho Chi Minh Communist Youth Union in the 9th Congress of the Youth Union, as well as the Chairman of the National Committee on Youth of Vietnam. On 29 February 2008, at the 5th Conference of the Central Committee of the Vietnam Youth Federation, Võ Văn Thưởng was elected as the 5th President of the Vietnam Youth Federation.

Provincial career 
Võ Văn Thưởng was elected as a member of the 5th Ho Chi Minh City People's Council (term 1999 – 2004). In July 2007, he was elected as a member of the 12th National Assembly (2007–2011) in Vinh Long province. 

On 18 January 2011, at the 11th Congress of the Communist Party of Vietnam, Võ Văn Thưởng was elected as an full member of the 11th Central Committee of the Communist Party of Vietnam (2011–2016). In August 2011, he was assigned by the Politburo to hold the position of Secretary of the Quang Ngai Provincial Party Committee. 

On 15 April 2014, he became the Vice Standing Secretary of the Ho Chi Minh City Party Committee, 9th tenure (2010–2015), replacing Nguyen Van Dua, also a former Secretary of the Ho Chi Minh City Youth Union. On 17 October 2015, he was re-elected as Vice Standing Secretary of the Ho Chi Minh City Party Committee.

On 26 January 2016, at the 12th National Party Congress, Võ Văn Thưởng was elected a member of the 12th Central Committee of the Communist Party of Vietnam. On 27 January 2016, he was elected to the Politburo by the 12th Central Committee, the youngest member of the 12th Politburo, at the age of 46. On 4 February 2016, he resigned from the position of Permanent Deputy Secretary of the Ho Chi Minh City Party Committee, resigned from the Standing Committee of the City Party Committee, and was instead assigned by the Politburo to become a member of the Secretariat of the Communist Party of Vietnam, and hold the position of Head of the Central Propaganda Department of the Communist Party of Vietnam. On 22 May 2016, he was elected as a member of the 14th National Assembly (2016–2021) in constituency No. 01 of Dong Nai province including Bien Hoa city and districts: Long Thanh, Nhon Trach, with 676,517 votes, or 68.41% of  total valid votes.

Entering national politics

Standing Secretaryship 
On 30 January 2021, at the 13th National Party Congress, he was elected as a full member of the 13th Central Committee of the Communist Party of Vietnam. On 31 January, at the first plenum of the 13th Party Central Committee, he was elected to the Politburo of the 13th Central Committee of the Communist Party of Vietnam. On 6 February, he was appointed the standing secretary of the Communist Party of Vietnam Central Committee's Secretariat.

Presidency 

On 2 March, The National Assembly passed a resolution on Thursday morning to elect Võ Văn Thưởng, Standing Member of the Communist Party's Secretariat, Vietnam's new president under CPV General Secretary Nguyễn Phú Trọng.

Note

References 

1970 births
Living people
Vietnamese politicians
Presidents of Vietnam
Members of the 12th Politburo of the Communist Party of Vietnam
Members of the 13th Politburo of the Communist Party of Vietnam
Members of the 12th Secretariat of the Communist Party of Vietnam
Members of the 13th Secretariat of the Communist Party of Vietnam
Alternates of the 10th Central Committee of the Communist Party of Vietnam
Members of the 11th Central Committee of the Communist Party of Vietnam
Members of the 12th Central Committee of the Communist Party of Vietnam
Members of the 13th Central Committee of the Communist Party of Vietnam
People from Hải Dương province